The Book of Jubilees, sometimes called Lesser Genesis (Leptogenesis), is an ancient Jewish religious work of 50 chapters (1,341 verses), considered canonical by the Ethiopian Orthodox Church as well as Beta Israel (Ethiopian Jews), where it is known as the Book of Division (Ge'ez: መጽሐፈ ኩፋሌ Mets'hafe Kufale). Jubilees is considered one of the pseudepigrapha by Roman Catholic, Eastern Orthodox, and Protestant Churches. It is also not considered canonical within Judaism outside of Beta Israel.

It was well known to Early Christians, as evidenced by the writings of Epiphanius, Justin Martyr, Origen, Diodorus of Tarsus, Isidore of Alexandria, Isidore of Seville, Eutychius of Alexandria, John Malalas, George Syncellus, and George Kedrenos. The text was also utilized by the community that originally collected the Dead Sea Scrolls. No complete Greek or Latin version is known to have survived, but the Ge'ez version has been shown to be an accurate translation of the versions found in the Dead Sea Scrolls.

The Book of Jubilees claims to present "the history of the division of the days of the Law, of the events of the years, the year-weeks, and the jubilees of the world" as revealed to Moses (in addition to the Torah or "Instruction") by angels while he was on Mount Sinai for forty days and forty nights. The chronology given in Jubilees is based on multiples of seven; the jubilees are periods of 49 years (seven "year-weeks"), into which all of time has been divided.

Manuscripts 
Until the discovery of extensive fragments among the Dead Sea Scrolls, the earliest surviving manuscripts of Jubilees were four complete Ge'ez texts dating to the 15th and 16th centuries, and several quotations by the Church fathers such as Epiphanius, Justin Martyr, Origen as well as Diodorus of Tarsus, Isidore of Alexandria, Isidore of Seville, Eutychius of Alexandria, John Malalas, George Syncellus, and George Kedrenos. There is also a preserved fragment of a Latin translation of the Greek that contains about a quarter of the whole work. The Ethiopic texts, now numbering twenty-seven, are the primary basis for translations into English. Passages in the texts of Jubilees that are directly parallel to verses in Genesis do not directly reproduce either of the two surviving manuscript traditions. Consequently, even before the Qumran discoveries, R.H. Charles had deduced that the Hebrew original had used an otherwise unrecorded text for Genesis and for the early chapters of Exodus, one independent either of the Masoretic text or of the Hebrew text that was the basis for the Septuagint. According to one historian, the variation among parallel manuscript traditions that are exhibited by the Septuagint compared with the Masoretic text, and which are embodied in the further variants among the Dead Sea Scrolls, demonstrates that even canonical Hebrew texts did not possess any single "authorized" manuscript tradition before the Common Era. Others write about the existence of three main textual manuscript traditions (namely the Babylonian, Samarian and Pre-Masoretic "proto" textual traditions). Although the Pre-Masoretic text may have indeed been authoritative back then, arguments can be made for and against this concept.

Between 1947 and 1956, approximately 15 Jubilees scrolls were found in five caves at Qumran, all written in Hebrew.  The large number of manuscripts (more than for any biblical books except for Psalms, Deuteronomy, Isaiah, Exodus, and Genesis, in descending order) indicates that Jubilees was widely used at Qumran. A comparison of the Qumran texts with the Ethiopic version, performed by James VanderKam, found that the Ethiopic was in most respects an accurate and literalistic translation.

Origins 
Robert Henry Charles (1855–1931) became the first biblical scholar to propose an origin for Jubilees. Charles suggested that the author of Jubilees may have been a Pharisee and that Jubilees was the product of the midrash which had already been worked on in the Tanakh/Old Testament Books of Chronicles. With the discovery of the Dead Sea Scrolls at Qumran in 1947, Charles' Pharisaic hypothesis of the origin of Jubilees has been almost completely abandoned.

The dating of Jubilees has been problematic for biblical scholars. While the oldest extant copies of Jubilees can be assigned on the basis of the handwriting to about 100 BC, there is much evidence to suggest Jubilees was written prior to this date.

Jubilees could not have been written very long prior. Jubilees at 4:17-25 records that Enoch "saw in a vision what has happened and what will occur", and the book contains many points of information otherwise found earliest in the Enochian "Animal Apocalypse" (1 Enoch chapters 83-90), such as Enoch's wife being Edna. The Animal Apocalypse claims to predict the Maccabean Revolt (which occurred 167-160 BC) and is commonly dated to that time. The direction of dependence has been controversial, but the consensus since 2008 has been that the Animal Apocalypse came first and Jubilees after.

As a result, general reference works such as the Oxford Annotated Bible and the Mercer Bible Dictionary conclude the work can be dated to 160–150 BC.

Subsequent use 
The Hasmoneans adopted Jubilees immediately, and it became a source for the Aramaic Levi Document. Jubilees remained a point of reference for priestly circles (although they disputed its calendric proposal), and the Temple Scroll and "Epistle of Enoch" (1 Enoch 91:1–10, 92:3–93:10, 91:11–92:2, 93:11–105:3) are based on Jubilees. It is the source for certain of the Testaments of the Twelve Patriarchs, for instance that of Reuben.

There is no official record of it in Pharisaic or Rabbinic sources. It was among several books that the Sanhedrin left out when the Bible was canonized. Sub rosa, many of the traditions which Jubilees had novelly included are echoed in later Jewish sources, in particular in the 12th century Midrash Tadshe which contains multiple similarities to Jubilees. The sole exception within Judaism, the Beta Israel Jews formerly of Ethiopia, regard the Ge'ez text as canonical.

It appears that early Christian writers held the book of Jubilees in high regard, as many of them cited and alluded to Jubilees in their writing. In relationship to the New Testament, the book of Jubilees contains one of the earliest references to the idea that God gave the Law to Moses through an angelic mediator. This idea is likewise reflected in the epistle to the Galatians.

Jan van Reeth argues that the Book of Jubilees had great influence on the formation of Islam. Etsuko Katsumata, comparing the Book of Jubilees and the Quran, notices significant differences, especially in Abraham's role in the Quranic narrative. He says that "The Quran has many passages in which Abraham expounds the errors in idolatry. In these passages, Abraham always addresses his words to local people, and he does not leave their land. This probably reflects Islam’s position that aims at converting idol worshippers to monotheistic religion and settling in their place of residence."

Content 
Jubilees covers much of the same ground as Genesis, but often with additional detail, and addressing Moses in the second person as the entire history of creation, and of Israel up to that point, is recounted in divisions of 49 years each, or "Jubilees".  The elapsed time from the creation, up to Moses receiving the scriptures upon Sinai during the Exodus, is calculated as fifty Jubilees, less the 40 years still to be spent wandering in the desert before entering Canaan – or 2,410 years.

Four classes of angels are mentioned: angels of the presence, angels of sanctifications, guardian angels over individuals, and angels presiding over the phenomena of nature. Enoch was the first man initiated by the angels in the art of writing, and wrote down, accordingly, all the secrets of astronomy, of chronology, and of the world's epochs. As regards demonology, the writer's position is largely that of the deuterocanonical writings from both New and Old Testament times.

The Book of Jubilees narrates the genesis of angels on the first day of Creation and the story of how a group of fallen angels mated with mortal females, giving rise to a race of giants known as the Nephilim, and then to their descendants, the Elioud.  The Ethiopian version states that the "angels" were in fact the disobedient offspring of Seth (Deqiqa Set), while the "mortal females" were daughters of Cain. This is also the view held by Clementine literature, Sextus Julius Africanus, Ephrem the Syrian, Augustine of Hippo, and John Chrysostom among many early Christian authorities. Their hybrid children, the Nephilim in existence during the time of Noah, were wiped out by the great flood. Jubilees also states that God granted ten percent of the disembodied spirits of the Nephilim to try to lead mankind astray after the flood.

Jubilees makes an incestuous reference regarding the son of Adam and Eve, Cain, and his wife. In chapter iv (1–12) (Cain and Abel), it mentions that Cain took his sister Awan to be his wife and Enoch was their child. It also mentions that Seth (the third son of Adam and Eve) married his sister Azura.

According to this book, Hebrew is the language of Heaven, and was originally spoken by all creatures in the Garden, animals and man; however, the animals lost their power of speech when Adam and Eve were expelled. Following the Deluge, the earth was apportioned into three divisions for the three sons of Noah, and his sixteen grandsons. After the destruction of the Tower of Babel, their families were scattered to their respective allotments, and Hebrew was forgotten, until Abraham was taught it by the angels.

Jubilees also contains a few scattered allusions to the Messianic kingdom. Robert Henry Charles wrote in 1913: 

Jubilees insists (in Chapter 6) on a 364 day yearly calendar, made up of four quarters of 13 weeks each, rather than a year of 12 lunar months, which it says is off by 10 days per year (the actual number being about 11¼ days). It also insists on a "Double Sabbath" each year being counted as only one day to arrive at this computation.

Jubilees 7:20–29 is possibly an early reference to the Noahide laws.

Sources 
 Jubilees bases its take on Enoch on the "Book of Watchers", 1 Enoch 1–36.
 Its sequence of events leading to the Flood match those of the "Dream Visions", 1 Enoch 83–90.

See also 
 Generations of Adam
 Wives aboard Noah's Ark

Notes

References 
 Martin Jr. Abegg. The Dead Sea Scrolls Bible. San Francisco, CA: HarperCollins, 1999. .
 Matthias Albani, Jörg Frey, Armin Lange. Studies in the Book of Jubilees. Leuven: Peeters, 1997. .
 Chanoch Albeck.  Berlin: Scholem, 1930.
 Robert Henry Charles. The Ethiopic Version of the Hebrew Book of Jubilees. Oxford: Clarendon, 1895.
 Robert Henry Charles. The Book of Jubilees or the Little Genesis, Translated from the Editor's Ethiopic Text, and Edited with Introduction, Notes, and Indices (London: 1902).
 Gene L. Davenport. The Eschatology of the Book of Jubilees (SPB 20) Leiden: Brill, 1971.
 Albert-Marie Denis.  ( 4; Louvain: CETEDOC, 1973)
 August Dillmann. "Mashafa kufale sive Liber Jubilaeorum... aethiopice". Kiel, and London: Van Maack, Williams &Norgate, 1859.
 August Dillmann, and Hermann Rönsch. Das Buch der Jubiläen; oder, Die kleine Genesis. Leipzig: 1874.
 John C. Endres. Biblical Interpretation in the Book of Jubilees (Catholic Biblical Quarterly Monograph Series 18) Washington: Catholic Biblical Association of America, 1987. .
 
 James L. Kugel, A walk through Jubilees : studies in the Book of Jubilees and the world of its creation, (Brill Academic Publishers, 2012); 
 
 Michael Segal. The Book of Jubilees: Rewritten Bible, Redaction, Ideology and Theology. Leiden-Boston, 2007. .
 Michel Testuz.  Geneva: Droz, 1960.
 James C. VanderKam. Textual and Historical Studies in the Book of Jubilees (Harvard Semitic monographs, no. 14) Missoula: Scholars Press, 1977.
 James C. VanderKam. The Book of Jubilees. A Critical Text. Leuven: Peeters, 1989. .
 James C. VanderKam. The Book of Jubilees. Translation. Leuven: Peeters, 1989. .
 James C. VanderKam. The Book of Jubilees (Guides to Apocrypha and Pseudepigrapha). Sheffield: Sheffield Academic Press, 2001. . .
 Orval S. Wintermute, "Jubilees", in Old Testament Pseudepigrapha, ed. James H. Charlesworth (Garden City, N.Y.: Doubleday, 1985) 2:35–142

External links 
 The text translated by R.H. Charles, 1902, with introduction and notes.
 Jewish Encyclopedia entry
 The Catholic Encyclopedia view
 Development of the Canon
 Jubilees at earlyjewishwritings.com
 Ge'ez text of Jubilees (first page)
 Ethiopic Jubilees Reading Guide: 11:1-10
 Ethiopic Jubilees Reading Guide: 17:15-18:16
 

2nd-century BC books
Ancient Hebrew texts
 
Jewish apocrypha
Old Testament pseudepigrapha
Texts attributed to Moses